A constitutional referendum was held in Liberia on 1 May 1945. The change to the constitution was approved in the Legislature in December 1945, and would grant the right to vote to citizens living in the three inland provinces, providing they paid a "hut tax". It also granted parliamentary representation to Grand Cape Mount County and Marshall territory. The changes were approved by voters.

Constitutional change
The proposed changes would be to Chapter I, article 11 and Chapter II, article 2.

A two-thirds majority in the vote was necessary for the changes to be approved.

References

1945 referendums
1945 in Liberia
Referendums in Liberia
Suffrage referendums
Constitutional referendums in Liberia
May 1945 events